In Greek mythology, Athena is a goddess of wisdom, strategic-war and weaving.

Athena may also refer to:

 Athena (given name), for people and fictional characters

Places
 Athena, Oregon, United States
 Athena (Olympic Mountains), a summit in Olympic National Park, United States
 Leicester Athena, venue and landmark in the English Midlands

Companies
 Athena (game developer), Japan
 Athena Computer & Electronic Systems, a defunct American laptop pioneer
 Athena Eizou, a Japanese adult video company
 Athena (retailer), a British art retailer famous for its posters
 Athena Scientific, a science and engineering publishing company co-founded by MIT professor Dimitri Bertsekas
 Athena Technologies, a Virginia-based company specializing in navigation and control systems for unmanned aerial vehicles
 athenahealth, a Massachusetts-based Healthcare technology company

Arts and entertainment

Music
 Athena (band), a Turkish ska punk band
 "Athena (song)", the first track on The Who's 1982 studio album, It's Hard
 "Athena", a song by Tiësto from the album Parade of the Athletes
 "Athena", a song by Greyson Chance from the album Palladium

Video games
 Athena (arcade game), a 1986 arcade game made by SNK, whose main character is "Princess Athena"
 Psycho Soldier, the 1987 sequel to the arcade game, sometimes referred to as Athena 2
 Athena: Full Throttle, a 2006 sequel to the arcade game
 Athena (game developer), Japan

Other uses in arts and entertainment
 Athena (1954 film), an MGM musical
 Athena (2022 film), a French film
 Athena (novel), a 1995 novel by John Banville
 Athena: Goddess of War, a 2010 South Korean television drama series
 Mourning Athena, a Greek relief sculpture dating around c.470 BC
 Athena Parthenos, a Greek statue in the Parthenos

Ships
 Athena (yacht), formerly the largest private sailing yacht in the world
 MV Astoria, cruiseliner formerly "MS Athena", former transatlantic liner Stockholm
 MS Pearl Seaways, cruise-ferry formerly "M/S Athena" 
 MS Athina B, coaster that beached at Brighton in 1980, sometimes mis-reported as Athena B
 FV Athena, a supertrawler and factory ship that caught fire in October 2010
 SS Athena, a 1893 Greek steamship

Science and technology

Equipment in outer space
 Athena (spacecraft), a small proposed probe to visit Pallas, the asteroid
 Athena (rocket family), Lockheed Martin's series of light rocket boosters 
Athena I
Athena II
 Advanced Telescope for High Energy Astrophysics, a planned space telescope by the ESA
 Athena-Fidus, a French-Italian, military communications satellite
 Athena, the scientific payload on the Mars Exploration Rovers

Other uses in science and technology
 ATHENA, a CERN antimatter research project
 ATHENA computer, an early missile guidance computer
 Athena 1, an early laptop
 Project Athena, a project to produce a computing environment for educational use
 X Athena Widgets, X Window System's widget toolkit
 Advanced Test High Energy Asset, a directed-energy weapon
 Amazon Athena, a database system

Other uses
 ATHENA (European cultural heritage project) an EU-funded project
 November 2012 nor'easter, referred to by The Weather Channel as Winter Storm Athena
 Operation ATHENA, Canada's involvement in the 2001 War in Afghanistan
 Ulmus parvifolia 'Emer I', an elm cultivar, sold as "Athena"

See also

Atena (disambiguation)
Athene (disambiguation)
Athens (disambiguation)
Athina (disambiguation)
Altena (disambiguation)
SS Athenia
Aethina, a genus of beetle including the small hive beetle (Aethina tumida)
Pallas Athena (disambiguation)
Temple of Athena (disambiguation)